Bhadran Mattel (born 22 November 1952) is an Indian filmmaker and writer, whose career spans more than 40 years. Bhadran's body of work addresses such themes as victimization of ill-mannered parenting, concepts of psychological trauma's and redemption, objectification of fatherhood, childhood distresses, intense metaphorical placements of matter and animals, Biblical inspired backdrops, and autocrat Christian culture in typical parts of Kerala.

Among the very few filmmakers who ruled Malayalam film industry through the '80s and '90s, he is widely regarded as one of the most influential filmmakers to introduce thug life glorification of Malayalam superstars on screen, which went on to become the most popular concept of a typical mass film among Kerala film fans even these days. In 1986, he won the Filmfare Award for Best Director – Malayalam for Poomukhappadiyil Ninneyum Kaathu and repeated the feat of achievements again with two more Filmfares in the Best Director category through Iyer the Great and Spadikam in 1990 and 1995.

Mattel's directed works include the ruffian film Spadikam (1995), the psychic-precognition thriller Iyer the Great (1990), an investigative school drama Olympiyan Anthony Adam (1999), the parenthood of an obese caretaker Uncle Bun (1991), a psychic family drama Poomukhappadiyil Ninneyum Kaathu (1986), the musical Idanazhiyil Oru Kaalocha (1987), the mighty land tyrant Udayon (2005), Indian political thriller Yuvathurki (1996) and more. Most of his films involved actors Mohanlal and Mammootty. Having directed Mohanlal in seven films and Mammootty in four films, Bhadran's associations with them have resulted in Award nominations and wins for both.

Career

Bhadran's career has spanned over more than 40 years. He is formally trained in music and won many accolades during his academic years for acting in plays and writing. He always aspired to become a great film director.

His struggle to gain a foothold in the fiercely competitive industry bore fruit when he got the opportunity to work as the 8th Assistant Director for Hariharan on Rajahamsam under the banner of Supriya, the production house. Beginning with that film, he assisted Hariharan in 14 films, progressing from an apprentice to an associate director.

The first film under his direction was released in 1982. Ente Mohangal Poovaninju, starring Shankar, Mohanlal, Menaka, and Kala Ranjini, received immense critical appreciation and was popular with audiences. Bhadran's films drew inspiration from the lives of common people, blended with creative surrealism.  Changatham (Malayalam) was released in 1983, starring Mammootty, Mohanlal, and Madhavi, was released and made ripples on the mainstream cinematic landscape. Bhadran focussed on making 2–3 quality films per year.

Spadikam (Prism), released in 1995, was an action drama film written and directed by Bhadran. The title was chosen to depict the flickering nature of people who keep changing and adapting themselves to exploit situations to suit their needs. The prism splits the white light into a spectrum of seven vibrant colours.

Similarly, the star of the film Thomas Chacko, a village rowdy played by Mohanlal, transforms himself into various characters to face different situations. The film was one of the highest-grossing films in Kerala in 1995 and collected around INR 8 Crores. It was also the longest running film of 1995 and ran for 225 days, winning the Kerala State Film Award for Best Actor and Filmfare Award for Best Actor. Spadikam, which depicts parents standing in the way of their children's dreams, was Bhadran's most successful commercial film apart from being one of the highest-grossing films of Malayalam cinema, gaining cult status in Kerala's film culture.

The plot of the film Idanazhiyil Oru Kaalocha is that a teenage boy falls in love with an elderly lady, played by Vineeth and Karthika respectively. Iyer the Great, starring Mamootty and addressing a train accident in Peruman, became a landmark film in the Malayalam film scene.

In 2019, Bhadran announced that his next venture will be a film with Mohanlal called Joothan, with whom he will be doing a film after 16 years.

Also in 2019, when film director Biju announced that he will make the second part of the film Spadikam, Bhadran opposed it, and the project had to be shelved.

Filmography

Director

References 
 

Malayalam film directors
Malayalam screenwriters
Living people
20th-century Indian film directors
People from Pala, Kerala
Film directors from Kerala
Screenwriters from Kerala
Filmfare Awards South winners
1952 births